In graph theory, the Gallai–Edmonds decomposition is a partition of the vertices of a graph into three subsets which provides information on the structure of maximum matchings in the graph. Tibor Gallai and Jack Edmonds independently discovered it and proved its key properties.

The Gallai–Edmonds decomposition of a graph can be found using the blossom algorithm.

Properties

The set  is defined to contain all the inessential vertices.

The Gallai–Edmonds decomposition has the following properties:

In particular, each component has a near-perfect matching: a matching that covers all but one of the vertices.
 The subgraph induced by  has a perfect matching.

Generalizations 

The Gallai–Edmonds decomposition is a generalization of Dulmage–Mendelsohn decomposition from bipartite graphs to general graphs.

An extension of the Gallai–Edmonds decomposition theorem to multi-edge matchings is given in Katarzyna Paluch's "Capacitated Rank-Maximal Matchings".

References 

Graph algorithms
Matching (graph theory)